The men's long jump event at the 2004 World Junior Championships in Athletics was held in Grosseto, Italy, at Stadio Olimpico Carlo Zecchini on 13 and 14 July.

Medalists

Results

Final
14 July

Qualifications
13 July

Group A

Group B

Participation
According to an unofficial count, 27 athletes from 22 countries participated in the event.

References

Long jump
Long jump at the World Athletics U20 Championships